Ice Princess is a 2005 Disney film.

Ice Princess may also refer to:
Tabaluga (film), released variously as The Ice Princess, Ice Princess Lily, and The Ice Princess: A Tale of Fire and Ice in English-speaking countries.
 Ice Princess, a Femizons character from the Marvel Comics universe
"Ice Princess" (Sailor Moon), an episode of the manga series Sailor Moon
The Ice Princess (novel), a 2003 crime novel by Camilla Läckberg
Ice Princess saga, a series of episodes from the US soap opera General Hospital
"Ice Princess" (song) a 2014 song by American rapper Azealia Banks

See also
 Siberian Ice Maiden, a mummy of a woman found in the Republic of Altai, Russia